The Special Intervention Regiment (RSI) is a special forces regiment belonging to the Algerian Republican Guard based in Khemisti in the Tipaza Province.

History 
The Special Intervention Regiment was created in May 2015, by the former chief of staff of the Algerian army Ahmed Gaid Salah in person with the commander of the Republican Guard, the major general Ahmed Mouley Melliani.

Furthermore, it is the armed wing of the Republican Guard and the RSI is also a parachute unit since these operators are trained at the Special Troops Superior School (ESTS) in Biskra.

Missions 
The RSI has a various mission panel with the hostage rescue to the offensive action in mountain or in the desert, for example.

The missions of the RSI are:

 Counter-terrorism and hostage rescue
 Anti-guerilla warfare
 The neutralization of dangerous criminals or terrorists in urban, forest or desert areas.
 Close protection and escort of Very Important Persons and military personalities
 Recovery and protection of strategic areas

Organization 
The RSI is composed of several specialized companies with several specialized groups:

 The intervention company (with the counter terrorism group, the hostage rescue group...)
 The protection company (with the protection groups)
 The support company (with the sniper teams)
 The recognition company (with the combat divers group, and the recognition groups)
 The canine group
 The demining groups

Training 
The RSI's members are trained to the ESTS in Biskra for the parachuting part and for the desertic fight. Then they are trained at the commando instruction center (EFCIP) in Boghar in the Medea province where the training is devoted to field exercises, anti-guerilla combat, shooting, survival in hostile areas, and commando or specialized actions.

The RSI operators also have at their disposal the buildings and training buildings of the ICC and the 104th RMO for urban combat and for the hostage rescue drill in urban areas.

The RSI has training buildings in the headquarters in Khemisti.

In addition to this, the RSI's members regularly take part in internal exchanges with paratroopers of the Algerian army as well as with Algerian special forces (DSI, 104th RMO...).

Equipment

Weapons

Handguns 

 Glock 17 & 18
 Caracal

Assault rifles 

 AKMs
 AKM

Machine guns 

 RPD
 RPK
 PKM

Snipers 

 Zatsava M93 Black Arrow
 SVD

Shotguns 

 RS 202P

Others 

 RPG 7

The weapon has EOTech sights with laser sights and tactical lights.

Individual equipment 

 Spectra helmet
 Republican Guard lattice or grey suit
 Rangers
 Plate carrier
 Tactical vest
 Tactical thigh plate
 Tactical belt (brelage)
 Elbow and knee pads
 Protective goggles
 Balaclava
 Protective gloves
 Thigh holster
 Camelback
 Ghillie suit (for snipers and marksmen)

Vehicles 

 Mercedes-Benz G Class of the Republican Guard
 Pick-Up Mercedes-Benz G Class in 4X4 and 6X6
 Toyota Station in 4X4 or pick-up
 Toyota Land Cruiser in 4X4 or pick-up
 BMW R1200 RT (for the escort units)
 Mercedes-Benz Zetros
 Mercedes-Benz Unimog

Special 

 Fuch 2

Aerial transport 

 Algerian Air Force airplanes
 Mil Mi-171Sh of the Algerian Air Force

References

Special forces of Algeria
Military special forces battalions
Algerian Republican Guard